Roman Bronfman (born 22 April 1954) is a Ukrainian-born Israeli politician. He speaks Hebrew ,English, Russian, and Ukrainian.

Biography
Bronfman was born in Chernivtsi, Ukrainian SSR (now Ukraine), in the Soviet Union to a Jewish family. He studied at Chernivtsi University from 1971 to 1976. He was a journalist, and published articles in major newspapers in Moscow and Leningrad. Bronfman immigrated to Israel in 1980. He served in the Israeli Air Force, and participated in the 1982 Lebanon War. Following his military service, he studied at the Hebrew University of Jerusalem, and graduated with a PhD in Political Science in 1989. From 1986 to 1993, he was a lecturer at the Hebrew University and the University of Haifa. In the 1990s, he was a journalist for the Russian-language newspaper Aleph and for Maariv, and an announcer on Kol Israel's Russian-language service.

Political career 
In 1993 he became the Head of the Haifa Municipality Absorption Authority, and has held that post since then. That year he also was elected to the Haifa City Council, and became the Deputy Chairman of the Zionist Forum. He held both of those posts until 1996 when he was first elected to Knesset. During his time in Knesset he was a member of Yisrael BaAliyah and then the Democratic Choice.

He was a member of the House Committee, State Control Committee, Public Petitions Committee, Economic Affairs Committee, Constitution, Law and Justice Committee, Internal Affairs and Environment Committee, Committee on Drug Abuse, and the Committee for Immigration, Absorption, and Diaspora Affairs. During his time as a member of Knesset he was also a member of the Social-Environmental Lobby, Environmental Lobby, Lobby for the War Against Drugs in Israel, and the Lobby for the Galil and the Negev.

He lost the 2006 Knesset election, and no longer serves as a member of the Knesset.

Views and opinions
Bronfman has said that the Two State Solution is the only humane solution to the Israeli-Palestinian conflict. The unacceptable alternatives are to have a mass deportation of Palestinians from Gaza and the West Bank, or to brutally rule over the Palestinians in these territories.

In 2005 Bronfman submitted a bill to the Knesset that would amend the Dangerous Drugs Order so it would be legal to possess 50 grams, or about 1.8 ounces of cannabis, when before the legal amount to have in your possession was 15 grams, or 0.5 ounces. He said the total ban on cannabis had failed to stop cannabis use, and the way to stop its use was to go after drug dealers.

Published works
The Million that Changed the Middle East: Immigrants from the Former USSR, coauthored with Lily Galili

References

External links

 Dissent is not disloyalty article by Roman Bronfman in The Guardian
 Fanning the flames of hatred  By Roman Bronfman in Haaretz

1954 births
Living people
Israeli Jews
Leaders of political parties in Israel
Soviet emigrants to Israel
Soviet Jews
Hebrew University of Jerusalem Faculty of Social Sciences alumni
Democratic Choice (Israel) politicians
Yisrael BaAliyah politicians
Meretz politicians
Members of the 14th Knesset (1996–1999)
Members of the 15th Knesset (1999–2003)
Members of the 16th Knesset (2003–2006)
Chernivtsi University alumni